Kimmins High School is a girls' boarding school in Panchgani in the state of Maharashtra, India, founded in 1898. It was founded as the "sister" school of Queen Mary School, Mumbai, providing boarding school capability for girls who could not attend Queen Mary's as day students.

History 
Under the leadership of its founder, Miss Alice Emilie Kimmins, many buildings were completed over various periods. For 15 out of 23 years in Panchgani, she was involved in getting buildings planned and made.

Notable alumni
 Protima Bedi - dancer
 Jenny Bhatt - author
 Maria van der Linden, née Tarasiewicz - author

References

External links

Schools in Colonial India
Boarding schools in Maharashtra
Girls' schools in Maharashtra
High schools and secondary schools in Maharashtra
Panchgani
Educational institutions established in 1898
1898 establishments in India
